Mbigou Airport  is an airport serving the town of Mbigou in the Ngounié Province of Gabon.

See also

 List of airports in Gabon
 Transport in Gabon

References

External links
Mbigou Airport
OurAirports - Mbigou

Airports in Gabon